Wilfredo Limbana "Fred" Carrillo (1926–August 2005) was a Filipino comics artist.

Biography
Fred Carrillo was born in Kalibo, Aklan, Philippines. He began his career drawing propaganda material for the guerrilla movement in Panay during World War II. After the war, he began his career as a professional artist. Carrillo studied fine arts and architecture at the University of Santo Tomas.

He worked for DC Comics in the 1970s and 1980s and drew mystery titles such as Ghosts, Phantom Stranger, Secrets of Haunted House, The Unexpected, Weird War Tales, and The Witching Hour. After leaving the comics industry, he worked on various animation projects. Some of the television series with which he was involved include He-Man and the Masters of the Universe, The Transformers,  and Bionic Six. Carrillo died in August 2005.

Bibliography

Charlton Comics
 Tales of the Mysterious Traveler #14 (1985)

DC Comics
 
 Action Comics Weekly #617, 631–634 (1988–1989)
 DC Special Series #4 (1977)
 Ghosts #23, 32, 36–37, 41–42, 49, 57–58, 64–66, 79, 85, 87, 99–100, 105–106, 109 (1974–1982)
 G.I. Combat #188–189, 193, 196, 202–203, 210–211, 213, 215, 217, 220, 226, 236, 274, 276, 281 (1976–1986)
 House of Mystery #215, 265, 289, 296–297, 305 (1973–1982)
 House of Secrets #110, 145 (1973–1977)
 Phantom Stranger vol. 2 #38–41 (1975–1976)
 The Saga of the Swamp Thing #7–13 (Phantom Stranger backup stories) (1982–1983)
 Secrets of Haunted House #15, 23–24, 28, 33, 35, 44, 46 (1979–1982)
 Star Spangled War Stories #189 (1975)
 Swamp Thing  #24 (1976)
 Time Warp #4–5 (1980)
 The Unexpected #138, 141, 159, 163, 173–174, 181, 185–186, 189, 191–192, 217 (1972–1981)
 Unknown Soldier #219–221, 226–228 (1978–1979)
 Weird Mystery Tales #20, 23 (1975)
 Weird War Tales #40, 58, 65, 90, 94–95, 97, 102, 104–105, 107, 113–121, 123–124 (1975–1983)
 The Witching Hour #48, 50–51, 56, 58, 62–63, 66, 68, 74–75, 80, 83–85 (1974–1978)

Gold Key Comics
 The Twilight Zone #65 (1975)

Marvel Comics
 Impossible Man #2 (1991)
 In His Steps SC (1994)
 Savage Sword of Conan #170–171, 173, 182 (1990–1991)

Pendulum Press
 The Last of the Mohicans #1 (1977)
 White Fang #1 (1977)

Topps Comics
 Jurassic Park: Raptor #2 (1993)

Warren Publishing
 Creepy #116, 122, 126–131, 133–136, 138, 140–141 (1980–1982)
 Eerie #138 (1983)

References

External links
 

1926 births
2005 deaths
20th-century Filipino artists
21st-century Filipino artists
DC Comics people
Filipino animators
Filipino comics artists
People from Aklan
University of Santo Tomas alumni